Marius Diță (born 15 August 1975) is a Romanian former professional footballer who played as a defender and midfielder. In his career Diță played in the Liga I for FC Argeș Pitești, but mainly in the Liga II and Liga III for teams such as FC Bihor Oradea, Dacia Mioveni, Gloria Bistrița, Universitatea Cluj or Atletic Bradu, among others.

References

1975 births
Living people
People from Argeș County
Romanian footballers
Association football defenders
Liga I players
FC Argeș Pitești players
Liga II players
FC Dacia Pitești players
FC Politehnica Timișoara players
FC Bihor Oradea players
CS Mioveni players
ACF Gloria Bistrița players
FC Universitatea Cluj players
ASC Daco-Getica București players